Rhinella bergi is a species of toads in the family Bufonidae that is found in Argentina, Brazil, and Paraguay. Its natural habitats are dry savanna, moist savanna, subtropical or tropical seasonally wet or flooded lowland grassland, freshwater marshes, intermittent freshwater marshes, arable land, pastureland, and ponds. It is threatened by habitat loss.

References

bergi
Amphibians described in 2000
Amphibians of Argentina
Amphibians of Brazil
Amphibians of Paraguay
Fauna of the Pantanal
Taxonomy articles created by Polbot